Yurtsovo is a rural locality (a village) in Gorkinskoye Rural Settlement, Kirzhachsky District, Vladimir Oblast, Russia. The population was 23 as of 2010. There are 8 streets.

Geography 
Yurtsovo is located 8 km west of Kirzhach (the district's administrative centre) by road. Naumovo is the nearest rural locality.

References 

Rural localities in Kirzhachsky District